Flashlights is the third record by the Atlanta-based independent rock band Y-O-U. The album was first made available via free download on the band's MySpace profile on New Year's Day, 2007, and on compact disc on January 23 of the same year.

According to the band's official MySpace profile, Flashlights was the exclusive theme music of the Phillips Lounge at the 2007 Sundance Film Festival.

Track listing
 "The Physics of Giving (Einstein Song)" - 4:23
 "Goodnight Goes" - 8:32
 "Medicine Man" - 3:45
 "Moviekiss" (new version) - 3:43
 "...Now Everyone Knows..." (an extended ending of "Moviekiss") - 1:39
 "Glad" - 1:03
 "I Found You" - 2:12
 "Break" - 5:11
 "Alright, Alright, Alright" - 2:27
 "All Arranged #7" (a different version of "All Arranged #2" from Everything is Shifting) - 4:30
 "Second Chance" - 3:43
 "Let It Go" - 3:05
 "Glad I Found You. Again." - 0:40
 "Effort" - 5:46

Music videos
"The Physics of Giving"
Dir: Ryan Sterritt (Homestar Runner technician)
Sign language: Y-O-U

"Moviekiss"
Dir: Adam Stills
Video is composed of kiss scenes from movies.
One video uses album version; an alternate similar video uses a live performance track.

"Break"
Dir: Tyler James
Feat: Clay Cook
Song is a live performance, not the album version.
Filmed in stop-motion animation.

Personnel

Y-O-U is
Nicholas Niespodziani
Peter Olson
?Mark Cobb

Additional musicians
Clay Cook - Guitar, organ, Rhodes, pedal steel, banjo, backing vocals
Mark Bencuya - Piano, Wurlitzer, ARP strings
Dog Stevens (Cobb) - Typewriter
Saul Pimon (Olson) - Indian flute
Lenny Koggins (Niespodziani) - Recorders

Technical
Producer: Geoff Melkonian and Y-O-U
Additional production: Kristofer Sampson and Cliff Byrd
Engineer: Kristofer Sampson
Additional engineering: Clay Cook, Peter Olson, Nicholas Niespodziani
Mixer: David Barbe
Mastered by: Alex Lowe
Art Design & Photography: Theodore Schuyler

References
Atlanta Music Guide recent news (Google cached copy)
Deadjournalist interview with Nick Niespodziani

2007 albums
Y-O-U albums